Floodwood River is an  river in Ontonagon County in the U.S. state of Michigan.

The Floodwood is one of several nearly parallel streams draining the highlands of Ontonagon Township. Other nearby rivers (from west to east) include: 
 Little Iron River
 Iron River
 Mineral River
 Little Cranberry River
 Cranberry River
 Floodwood River
 Potato River

References 

Rivers of Michigan
Rivers of Ontonagon County, Michigan
Tributaries of Lake Superior